John Reilly (born 21 March 1962, in Dundee) is a Scottish former professional footballer who played as a striker. Reilly began his career with Dundee United, signing as a schoolboy from Strathtay Boys Club in 1979. He played for the Scotland Under 17 and Under 18 professional youth sides before making his first-team debut in August 1980. He was a member of the squad that won a Premier League Winners medal in season 1982–1983 before going onto score the club's first ever goal in the European Cup the following season. Signing for Motherwell in 1985, Reilly suffered an achilles tendon injury in his first game for the club and despite seeing several specialists over the next 18 months was forced into early retirement. After revolutionary surgery five years later however, he was able to continue playing and went on to play a handful of games for a number of Scottish lower league clubs, including Dunfermline Athletic and East Fife, while taking on a player/manager role at Cowdenbeath F.C.

After retiring for the second time in the mid-1990s, Reilly remained in the game working as a journalist covering lower-division football for a national newspaper. Reilly was inducted into Dundee United's Hall of Fame in February 2013.

Honours

Dundee United
Scottish Premier Division: 1
 1982–83

References

External links
 

1962 births
Living people
Scottish footballers
Footballers from Dundee
Scottish football managers
Association football forwards
Scottish Football League players
Dundee United F.C. players
Motherwell F.C. players
Dunfermline Athletic F.C. players
East Fife F.C. players
Cowdenbeath F.C. players
Arbroath F.C. players
Forfar Athletic F.C. players
Albion Rovers F.C. players
Cowdenbeath F.C. managers
Scottish Football League managers